The 1910 South Dakota gubernatorial election was held on November 8, 1910. Incumbent Republican Governor Robert S. Vessey ran for re-election to a second term. He faced two serious competitors in the Republican primary: colorful disbarred attorney George W. Egan and former Governor Samuel H. Elrod, and won the primary only with a narrow plurality. In the general election, he faced Democratic nominee Chauncey L. Wood, the Mayor of Rapid City. He improved on his margin from 1908, defeating Wood in a landslide.

Primary elections
Primary elections were held on June 7, 1910.

Democratic primary

Candidates
Chauncey L. Wood, Mayor of Rapid City

Results

Republican primary

Candidates
Robert S. Vessey, incumbent Governor
George W. Egan, disbarred attorney
Samuel H. Elrod, former Governor

Results

Prohibition primary

Candidates
 O. W. Butterfield

Results

General election

Candidates
Chauncey L. Wood, Democratic
Robert S. Vessey, Republican
O. W. Butterfield, Prohibition
M. G. Opsahl, Independent

Results

References

1910
South Dakota
Gubernatorial
November 1910 events